Private Jones is a 1933 American pre-Code comedy film directed by Russell Mack and written by Prescott Chaplin, Bill Cohen, George Jessel, William N. Robson and Sam Spewack. The film, which stars Lee Tracy, Gloria Stuart, Donald Cook, Emma Dunn, Shirley Grey and Frank McHugh, was released by Universal Pictures on March 25, 1933.

Plot
Mr. Jones is drafted to fight in World War I, after America declares war on Germany in 1917. He is, however, wholly unwilling. He attempts to evade the draft by arguing to be the sole provider for his family, but to no avail. He "snarl[s] at patriotism," and does not think there is any reason for him to fight the Germans. After actively fighting for his country, his opinions may have changed.

Cast 
Lee Tracy as Pvt. William 'Bill' Jones
Gloria Stuart as Mary Gregg
Donald Cook as Lt. John Gregg
Emma Dunn as Mrs. Jones
Shirley Grey as Helen Jones
Frank McHugh as 'Greasy'
Russell Gleason as Williams
Walter Catlett as Spivey
Berton Churchill as Roger Winthrop

References

External links 
 

1933 films
American comedy films
1933 comedy films
Universal Pictures films
Films directed by Russell Mack
American black-and-white films
1930s English-language films
1930s American films
Films with screenplays by Richard Schayer
Films set in 1917
American World War I films